The Freelance Solidarity Project is a division of the US-based National Writers Union (NWU) that organizes freelance media and communications workers. The group formed in 2018 out of meetings held by the Writers Guild of America, East, although the founding journalists eventually decided to affiliate with the NWU.

References

Further reading

External links
 Official website

American writers' organizations
Communications trade unions
Organizations established in 2018
2018 establishments in the United States